Paravoor Sreedharan Thanthrikal was a teacher of Tantric Rituals and Vedas from the state of Kerala, South India.

Life

He was a Tantri and priest in Sreekanteswara (Shiva) temple, Kozhikode which was established by the Hindu philosopher and teacher Sree Narayana Guru. He learnt under the Tantri maestro Kandassan asan (Sreekandan vaidyar) of Ayyampilly, a disciple of Kochunni thampuran of kodungallur. Asan made him join Pazhoor padippura to learn practical applications of astrology. He was also a lyricist of Malayalam devotional songs and an astronomer. 

He participated in the Ashtamangala Devaprasnam at Sabarimala, Guruvayur, Vaikom, Chottanikkara, Kadambuzha and Kodungalloor temples. He was the recipient of several awards, including the Amrutha Keerthi Puraskar, Pavakulangara Award and the Swamy Mrudanandaji Memorial Adhyatma Puraskar.

References

External links
organiser Article
 http://vaikhari.org/sreedharanthanthri.html
 http://www.haindavakeralam.com/HKPage.aspx?PageID=14318

Narayana Guru
People from Kozhikode district
Indian Hindu spiritual teachers
Scholars from Kerala